Stillwater Regional Airport  is in Payne County, Oklahoma, United States, three miles (4.8 km) northwest of Stillwater.

History  
After World War II the airfield was one of six locations in the nation that stored surplus military aircraft; about 475 were flown to the airport starting in 1945. In 1946 Paul Mantz bought them all, keeping 12 for use as stunt planes and camera ships and selling the rest for scrap.

One of the aircraft at Stillwater – purchased by Mantz – was B-17 41-24577 "Hells Angels," the first B-17 to complete 25 missions (even before the Memphis Belle).

Historical airline service

Central Airlines Douglas DC-3s landed at Stillwater beginning in 1953 with flights to Oklahoma City and Tulsa. Central merged with the original Frontier Airlines in 1967, and service was then provided with flights between Kansas City and Dallas/Fort Worth that stopped at Stillwater and many other points. Frontier upgraded service using the Convair 580 aircraft until flights ended in late 1975. Stillwater then went without commercial air service until 1980.

Metro Airlines began serving Stillwater in 1980 with flights to Oklahoma City using de Havilland Canada DHC-6 Twin Otters. Service continued until 1985 when Exec Express, Inc. took over servicing Stillwater with flights to Tulsa, using Piper PA-31 Navajo commuter planes. Stillwater was the home for Exec Express, but their service was short-lived, ending within one year as the airline focused on providing Essential Air Service to the nearby communities of Enid and Ponca City, Oklahoma. Stillwater then went without commercial air service.

After thirty years with no airline flights, local efforts landed American Airlines regional partner Envoy Air to Stillwater, operating as American Eagle. Service began on August 23, 2016, using Embraer-145 regional jets nonstop to Dallas/Fort Worth International Airport. Two daily flights are operated, with a third flight during busier periods.

Many Oklahoma State University teams and those who visit the Cowboys fly into Stillwater on small chartered planes. The Cowboy football team and opponents also frequently fly in and out of the airport.

Facilities
It has two runways: 17/35 is 7,401 by 100 feet (2,256 x 30 m) concrete; 4/22 is 5,002 by 75 feet (1,525 x 23 m) asphalt.

In the year ending March 31, 2022 the airport had 81,858 aircraft operations, an average of 224 per day: 91% general aviation, 6% military, 3% air taxi and less than 1% commercial airline. In February 2023, there were 90 aircraft based at this airport: 85 single-engine and 5 multi-engine.

The airport is home to the Oklahoma State University Flight Center, which trains students majoring or minoring in Aerospace Administration and Operations with a concentration in professional pilot. Their fleet consists of Cessna 152s, Cessna 172s, a Cessna 182RG, Cirrus SR-20s, and Piper PA-44s.

The airport is home to the Stillwater Airport Memorial Museum.

Airline and destination

Statistics

See also 
 List of airports in Oklahoma

References

External links 
Stillwater Regional Airport
 Stillwater Flight Center, the fixed-base operator (FBO)
Stillwater Composite Squadron Civil Air Patrol, the Civil Air Patrol Unit on the airport
 
 

Airports in Oklahoma
Searcy Field, OK
Buildings and structures in Payne County, Oklahoma